The ZTE Racer (also known as ZTE X850 in China but also ZTE Link in France, Soft Stone in Portugal, Dell XCD28 as marketed in India, Telstra Smart Touch T3020 in Australia and MTS 916 in Russia with 850MHz 3g network and 2100MHz 3g Network) is a phone manufactured by China's ZTE Corporation for the Android platform. It went on sale in July 2010, with a white variant released later.

Reviews
The ZTE Racer was targeted at the relatively small-budget Android market, and at a £99 introductory price was a good competitor with plentiful features, wireless connectivity, good still camera quality, great battery life and FM radio. The downsides of the device are the resistive touch-screen, bad resolution, screen viewing angles, general build quality and camera video quality being the main criticism of the device.

See also
 Galaxy Nexus
 List of Android devices

References

External links 
 ZTE Racer
 Engadget ZTE Racer review

Android (operating system) devices
ZTE mobile phones
Mobile phones introduced in 2010
Discontinued smartphones